Eva Karolina Aronson ( Hedén, 2 March 1908 – 8 January 1999) was a Sweden-born American chess player who held the title of Woman International Master (WIM, 1972). She was a winner the U.S. Women's Chess Championship (1972).

Biography
From the 1950s to the 1970s, Aronson was one of the leading chess players in the United States. She won the United States Women's Chess Championship in 1972. Also she four times won United States Women's Open Chess Championship: 1953, 1961, 1969, and 1973.

In 1967, Aronson participated in the Women's World Chess Championship Candidates Tournament in Subotica and ranked 18th place. In 1973, she participated in the Women's World Chess Championship Interzonal Tournament in Menorca and shared 17th-18th place.

Aronson played for United States in the Women's Chess Olympiad:
 In 1966, at first reserve board in the 3rd Chess Olympiad (women) in Oberhausen (+2, =0, -4).

In 1972, Aronson was awarded the FIDE Woman International Master (WIM) title. She was married to chess player Ninus Aronson (1897-1984).

References

External links

1908 births
1999 deaths
Sportspeople from Linköping
Chess Woman International Masters
American female chess players
Chess Olympiad competitors
20th-century chess players
20th-century American women
20th-century American people
Swedish emigrants to the United States